Asako (written: 麻子, 朝子, 浅子, 亜少子, あさ子 or あさこ in hiragana) from Japanese 麻 (asa) meaning "morning" combined with 子 (ko) meaning "child", is a feminine Japanese given name.

Notable persons 
, Japanese voice actress
Asako Hirabayashi, Japanese-American harpsichordist and composer
, Japanese businesswoman, banker and college founder
, Japanese women's footballer
, Japanese comedian
, Japanese journalist
 Japanese voice actress
, Japanese photographer
, Japanese voice actress
, Japanese volleyball player
, Japanese women's footballer and manager
, Japanese singer and composer
, Japanese sprint canoeist
, Japanese writer

Fictional characters
, a character in the manga series My Little Monster
, a character in the manga series Ushio and Tora

Films & Television 

 Asako I & II (寝ても覚めても, Netemo Sametemo, "whether asleep or awake"), a 2018 Japanese romance drama film directed by Ryūsuke Hamaguchi.

Japanese feminine given names